Hardrock or Hard Rock is a chapter of the Navajo Nation situated in Navajo County, Arizona. Its population as of the 2010 census is 1,161 living in an area of 78,100 acres.

References

External links 
 Official website

Populated places in Navajo County, Arizona